The following is an overview of 1921 in film, including significant events, a list of films released and notable births and deaths.

Top-grossing films (U.S.)
The top six films released in 1921 by U.S. gross are as follows:

Events
January 21 – The silent comedy drama The Kid, written by, produced by, directed by and starring Charlie Chaplin (in his Tramp character) – his first full-length film as a director – and featuring Jackie Coogan, is released in the United States. It is the year's second-highest-grossing film.
March 6 – The silent epic war film The Four Horsemen of the Apocalypse, adapted for the screen by June Mathis, is released in the United States. It is the year's highest-grossing film (and the sixth-best-grossing silent film of all time), propels Rudolph Valentino to stardom and inspires a tango craze and a fashion for gaucho pants.
August 29 – Broadway's first $1 million theatre, Loew's State opens.
September 5 – Popular comedian Roscoe "Fatty" Arbuckle attends a party at the St. Francis Hotel, San Francisco, during which actress Virginia Rappe is fatally injured; although he is eventually acquitted of rape and manslaughter, the scandal derails his career.
October 21 – George Melford's silent film The Sheik, which enhances leading actor Rudolph Valentino's international reputation as a Latin lover, is premiered in Los Angeles. Within the first year of its release, it exceeds $1 million in ticket sales.
October 26 – The Chicago Theatre, which will be the oldest surviving French-style Baroque Revival grand movie palace, opens.
The experimental short documentary film Manhatta is shot by painter Charles Sheeler and photographer Paul Strand in New York City.

Notable films released in 1921
United States unless stated.

A
The Ace of Hearts, directed by Wallace Worsley, starring Lon Chaney and Leatrice Joy
Action (lost), directed by John Ford, starring Hoot Gibson
The Adventures of Mr. Pickwick (lost), directed by Thomas Bentley, starring Frederick Volpe – (GB)
The Adventures of Tarzan, 15-part serial directed by Robert F. Hill and Scott Sidney, starring Elmo Lincoln
The Affairs of Anatol, directed by Cecil B. DeMille, starring Wallace Reid and Gloria Swanson
After Midnight, directed by Ralph Ince
After Your Own Heart, directed by George Marshall, starring Tom Mix
All Soul's Eve (lost), directed by Chester M. Franklin, starring Mary Miles Minter and Jack Holt, based on the 1920 stage play by Anne Crawford Flexner
Among Those Present, directed by Fred C. Newmeyer, starring Harold Lloyd
L'Atlantide, directed by Jacques Feyder, based on the 1919 novel by Pierre Benoit – (France)

B
Die Bergkatze (The Wild Cat), directed by Ernst Lubitsch, starring Pola Negri and Paul Heidemann – (Germany)
The Bigamist, starring and directed by Guy Newall with Ivy Duke – (GB)
The Blot, directed by Lois Weber
The Boat, directed by Edward F. Cline and Buster Keaton, starring Buster Keaton
The Bonnie Brier Bush (lost), starring and directed by Donald Crisp – (GB)
Brewster's Millions (lost), directed by Joseph Henabery, starring Roscoe "Fatty" Arbuckle
Brownie's Little Venus, directed by Fred Fishback, starring Baby Peggy
Buried Treasure, directed by George D. Baker, starring Marion Davies and Norman Kerry

C
The Call of Youth (lost), directed by Hugh Ford
Camille, directed by Ray C. Smallwood, starring Alla Nazimova and Rudolph Valentino
The Case of Becky, directed by Chester M. Franklin, starring Constance Binney, based on the 1912 stage play by David Belasco and Edward Locke
A Connecticut Yankee in King Arthur's Court (lost), directed by Emmett J. Flynn
The Conquering Power, directed by Rex Ingram, starring Rudolph Valentino and Alice Terry

D
Desire (Sehnsucht) (lost), directed by F. W. Murnau, starring Conrad Veidt – (Germany)
Destiny (Der müde Tod), directed by Fritz Lang, starring Lil Dagover and Rudolf Klein-Rogge – (Germany)
 The Devil, directed by James Young, starring George Arliss, based on the 1908 stage play by Ferenc Molnár
Disraeli (lost), directed by Henry Kolker, starring George Arliss
The Dollar-a-Year Man (lost), directed by James Cruze, starring Roscoe "Fatty" Arbuckle

E
El Capullo Marchito, directed by José Nepomuceno – (Philippines)
El Dorado, directed by Marcel L'Herbier – (France)
Enchantment, directed by Robert G. Vignola, starring Marion Davies
Experience (lost), directed by George Fitzmaurice, starring Richard Barthelmess

F
The Fire Eater, directed by B. Reeves Eason, starring Hoot Gibson
Fool's Paradise, directed by Cecil B. DeMille, starring Conrad Nagel and Mildred Harris
Forever (lost), directed by George Fitzmaurice, starring Elsie Ferguson and Wallace Reid
The Four Feathers, directed by René Plaissetty – (GB)
The Four Horsemen of the Apocalypse, directed by Rex Ingram, starring Rudolph Valentino

G
The Goat, directed by Mal St. Clair and Buster Keaton, starring Buster Keaton
The Ghost in the Garret (lost), directed by F. Richard Jones, starring Dorothy Gish
Godfather Death (Der Gevatter Tod), directed by Heinz Hanus, based on the 1884 short story Der Pate des Todes by Rudolf Baumbach – (Austria)
 The Grinning Face (Das grinsende Gesicht), directed by Julius Herska, based on the 1869 novel The Man Who Laughs by Victor Hugo – (Austria/Germany)
The Gunsaulus Mystery (lost), written and directed by Oscar Micheaux

H
Hail the Woman, directed by John Griffith Wray, starring Florence Vidor
The Haunted Castle (Schloß Vogelöd), directed by F. W. Murnau, based on the novel by Rudolf Stratz – (Germany)
The Haunted House, directed by Edward F. Cline and Buster Keaton, starring Buster Keaton
The High Sign, directed by Edward F. Cline and Buster Keaton, starring Buster Keaton
His Brother's Keeper (lost), directed by Wilfrid North
L'Homme qui vendit son âme au diable (The Man Who Sold His Soul to the Devil), directed by Pierre Caron – (France)
The Hound of the Baskervilles, directed by Maurice Elvey, starring Eille Norwood – (GB)
Humor Risk (unreleased), directed by Dick Smith, starring the Marx Brothers

I
The Idle Class, a Charles Chaplin short
The Indian Tomb (Das Indische Grabmal), directed by Joe May, starring Conrad Veidt – (Germany)
The Island of the Lost (Die Insel der Verschollenen), directed by Urban Gad, based on the 1896 novel The Island of Doctor Moreau by H. G. Wells without authorization – (Germany)

J
Jane Eyre, directed by Hugo Ballin, starring Norman Trevor and Mabel Ballin, based on the 1847 novel by Charlotte Brontë
Jánošík, directed by Jaroslav Jerry Siakeľ – (Czechoslovakia)
Jim the Penman, directed by Kenneth Webb, starring Lionel Barrymore
Journey into the Night (Der Gang in die Nacht), directed by F. W. Murnau – (Germany)

K
The Kid, a Charlie Chaplin film, with Jackie Coogan
Kipps, directed by Harold M. Shaw, starring George K. Arthur, based on the 1905 novel by H. G. Wells

L
Land of My Fathers directed by Fred Rains, starring John Stuart – (GB)
Leaves from Satan's Book (Blade af Satans Bog), directed by Carl Theodor Dreyer – (Denmark)
Little Lord Fauntleroy, directed by Alfred E. Green and Jack Pickford, starring Mary Pickford
The Lost Shadow (Der Verlorene Schatten) (lost), directed by Rochus Gliese, starring Paul Wegener – (Germany)
The Lotus Eater (lost), directed by Marshall Neilan, starring John Barrymore and Colleen Moore
The Love Light, directed by Frances Marion, starring Mary Pickford
 Lucky Carson (lost), directed by Wilfrid North, starring Earle Williams
The Lucky Dog, directed by Jess Robbins, starring Stan Laurel and Oliver Hardy

M
Mathias Sandorf, directed by Henri Fescourt, starring Romuald Joubé – (France)
The Mechanical Man (L'uomo meccanico) (lost), starring and directed by André Deed – (Italy)
A Message From Mars, directed by Maxwell Karger, starring Bert Lytell
A Midnight Bell (lost), starring and directed by Charles Ray, based on the 1889 stage play by Charles H. Hoyt
Miss Lulu Bett, directed by William C. deMille, starring Lois Wilson and Milton Sills
Il mostro di Frankenstein (The Monster of Frankenstein) (lost), directed by Eugenio Testa – (Italy)

N
Never Weaken, directed by Fred C. Newmeyer and Sam Taylor, starring Harold Lloyd
The Nut, directed by Theodore Reed, starring Douglas Fairbanks and Marguerite De La Motte

O
The Offenders (lost), directed by Fenwicke Holmes
Orphans of the Storm, directed by D. W. Griffith, starring Lillian Gish and Dorothy Gish
The Other Person (Onder spiritistischen dwang), directed by Maurits Binger and B. E. Doxat-Pratt, based on the 1920 novel by Fergus Hume – (Netherlands/GB)

P
The Painting of Osvaldo Mars (Il quadro di Osvaldo Mars), directed by Guido Brignone, starring Mercedes Brignone – (Italy)
Pan Twardowski, directed by Wiktor Biegański – (Poland)
The Passion Flower, directed by Herbert Brenon, starring Norma Talmadge
Peck's Bad Boy, directed by Sam Wood, starring Jackie Coogan
The Phantom Carriage (aka Korkarlen/ The Wagoner), directed by Victor Sjostrom, starring Sjostrom, Hilda Borgstrom and Tore Svennberg, based on the 1912 novel Thy Soul Shall Bear Witness! by Selma Lagerlof; this film influenced the later works of Ingmar Bergman – (Sweden)
The Playhouse, directed by Edward F. Cline and Buster Keaton, starring Buster Keaton

Q
The Queen of Sheba (lost), directed by J. Gordon Edwards, starring Betty Blythe

S
A Sailor-Made Man, directed by Fred C. Newmeyer, starring Harold Lloyd
School Days, directed by William Nigh, starring Wesley Barry
Sentimental Tommy (lost), directed by John S. Robertson, starring Gareth Hughes
Seven Years Bad Luck, a Max Linder film
The Sheik, directed by George Melford, starring Agnes Ayres and Rudolph Valentino
The Silver Lining, directed by Roland West, starring Jewel Carmen
The Sky Pilot, directed by King Vidor, starring Colleen Moore
Soul of the Cypress, directed by Dudley Murphy
Squibs, directed by George Pearson, starring Betty Balfour – (GB)
Sybil (lost), directed by Jack Denton, starring Evelyn Brent – (GB)

T
The Three Musketeers, directed by Fred Niblo, starring Douglas Fairbanks
Through the Back Door, directed by Alfred E. Green and Jack Pickford, starring Mary Pickford
Tol'able David, directed by Henry King, starring Richard Barthelmess
Les Trois Mousquetaires (The Three Musketeers), directed by Henri Diamant-Berger – (France)

W
Whispering Shadows, directed by Émile Chautard
White and Unmarried (lost), directed by Tom Forman, starring Thomas Meighan
Why Girls Leave Home (lost), directed by William Nigh, starring Anna Q. Nilsson
The Witching Hour, directed by William Desmond Taylor, starring Elliott Dexter, adapted from the 1907 stage play by Augustus Thomas
Woman's Place, directed by Victor Fleming, starring Constance Talmadge
The Wonderful Thing, directed by Herbert Brenon, starring Norma Talmadge and Harrison Ford

Comedy film series
Harold Lloyd (1913–1938)
Charlie Chaplin (1914–1940)
Lupino Lane (1915–1939)
Buster Keaton (1917–1944)
Laurel and Hardy (1921–1945)

Animated short film series
Aesop's Film Fables (1921–1934)
Felix the Cat (1919–1936)
Koko the Clown (1919–1963)

Births
January 3 – John Russell, actor (died 1991)
January 10 - George Robotham, American stuntman and actor (died 2007)
January 11 - Kathleen Byron, English actress (died 2009)
January 17 - Herb Ellis (actor), American character actor (died 2018)
January 26 – Elisabeth Kirkby, British-born Australian actress, producer and director
January 27 – Donna Reed, actress (died 1986)
January 31 
Carol Channing, musical actress (died 2019)
Mario Lanza, singer and actor (died 1959)
February 1 – Peter Sallis, actor (died 2017)
February 8 – Lana Turner, actress (died 1995)
February 16 – Vera-Ellen, actress, dancer (died 1981)
February 19 – Ann Savage, actress (died 2008)
February 22 – Giulietta Masina, actress (died 1994)
February 24 – Abe Vigoda, actor (died 2016)
February 26 – Betty Hutton, actress (died 2007)
March 3 – Diana Barrymore, actress (died 1960)
March 4 – Joan Greenwood, actress (died 1987)
March 8 – Alan Hale Jr., actor, restaurateur (died 1990)
March 10 – Charlotte Zucker, actress, mother of Jerry Zucker and David Zucker (died 2007)
March 12 – Gordon MacRae, actor, singer (died 1986)
March 23 – Geoffrey Chater, English actor (died 2021)
March 25 
Nancy Kelly, actress (died 1995)
Simone Signoret, actress (died 1985)
March 26 – Julie Harris, costume designer (died 2015)
March 28 – Dirk Bogarde, actor (died 1999)
April 1 – Arieh Elias, Israeli actor (died 2015)
April 3 – Jan Sterling, actress (died 2004)
April 10 – Chuck Connors, actor (died 1992)
April 16 – Peter Ustinov, actor (died 2004)
April 23
Janet Blair, actress (died 2007)
Gerald Campion, English actor (died 2002)
April 29 – Tommy Noonan, actor, screenwriter, producer (died 1968)
May 2 – Satyajit Ray, Indian filmmaker (died 1992)
May 16 - Harry Carey Jr., American actor (died 2012)
May 23
Grigori Chukhrai, Ukrainian film director (died 2001)
Ray Lawler, Australian actor
May 30 - Jamie Uys, South African film director (died 1996)
May 31 – Alida Valli, actress (died 2006)
June 8
Sheila Ryan, actress (died 1975)
Alexis Smith, actress (died 1993)
June 18 – Wesley Lau, actor (died 1984)
June 19 – Louis Jourdan, actor (died 2015)
June 21 
Judy Holliday, born Judith Tuvim, actress (died 1965)
Jane Russell, actress (died 2011)
July 2 - Maria Britneva, Russian-British actress (died 1994)
July 3 – Susan Peters, actress (died 1952)
July 5 – Patricia Wright, American former actress
July 6 – Nancy Reagan, born Anne Robbins, actress and First Lady of the United States (died 2016)
July 10 – Jeff Donnell, American actress (died 1988)
July 17 – František Zvarík, Slovakian actor (died 2008)
July 21 - Al Checco, American actor (died 2015)
July 23 – Robert Brown, actor (died 2003)
August 3 – Marilyn Maxwell, actress (died 1972)
August 8 – Esther Williams, actress, swimmer (died 2013)
August 19
Pasquale Cajano, Italian-American actor (died 2000)
Gene Roddenberry, screenwriter and producer (died 1991)
August 28 – Nancy Kulp, actress, comedienne (died 1991)
September 8 – Harry Secombe, actor, singer (died 2001)
September 27 – Miklós Jancsó, Hungarian director (died 2014)
September 30 – Deborah Kerr, actress (died 2007)
October 1 - James Whitmore, American actor (died 2009)
October 5 - Nikolay Dupak, Soviet-Russian actor
October 13 – Yves Montand, singer, actor (died 1991)
November 3 – Charles Bronson, actor (died 2003)
November 5 – Moritz Yomtov, screenwriter (died 1992)
November 8 – Walter Mirisch, American film producer (died 2023)
November 14 - Brian Keith, American actor (died 1997)
November 21 – Vivian Blaine, actor, singer (died 1995)
November 22 – Rodney Dangerfield, actor, comedian (died 2004)
November 23 – Fred Buscaglione, Italian actor and singer (died 1960)
December 4 – Deanna Durbin, actress (died 2013)
December 11 - Liz Smith, English character actress (died 2016)
December 15 - Nikolai Lebedev (actor), Soviet-Russian actor (died 2022)
December 24 - Mickey Knox, American actor (died 2013)
December 26 – Steve Allen, actor, composer, comedian, author (died 2000)

Deaths
 February 8 – George Formby Sr, 45, British music hall entertainer who appeared in one film (pulmonary tuberculosis)
 May 17 – Karl Mantzius, 61, Danish actor, theatre director, writer
 June 5 – Georges Feydeau, 58, French playwright, many of whose plays were adapted for the screen (syphilis)
 June 11 - Frank R. Mills, 50, American stage and screen actor
 June 20 – George Loane Tucker, 49, American actor, screenwriter and director
 July 9 – Robert Broderick, 56, American stage and film actor
 September 9 – Virginia Rappe, 30, American actress
 September 17 – Van Dyke Brooke, 62, American actor, screenwriter and film director

Film debuts
Richard Arlen
George Arliss
Billie Dove
Basil Rathbone
Carole Lombard in A Perfect Crime (1921)
Fredric March

See also
List of American films of 1921

References

 
Film by year